Elizabeth Stanton's Great Big World is an American educational television series produced by Associated Television International in which Elizabeth Stanton goes on a tour to places around the world.

Episodes

Season One (2011–2012)
 "African Safari" – September 15, 2011
 "Vietnam Is Listening" – September 22, 2011
 "Schools of Nicaragua" – September 29, 2011
 "The Spirit of Mississippi" – October 6, 2011
 "Caribbean Wildlife" – October 13, 2011
 "Caribbean Conservation" – November 3, 2011
 "Dolphin Adventure" – November 10, 2011
 "Florida Wildlife" – November 17, 2011
 "Miami Culture" – November 24, 2011
 "Eco Catalina" – December 8, 2011
 "Zoology 101" – December 15, 2011
 "Hogwarts, Sky Coasting, and Alligators" – January 19, 2012
 "Daytime Gives Back" – February 2, 2012
 "London Calling" – February 9, 2012
 "The Wild, Wild West" – February 16, 2012
 "Elizabeth Loves L.A." – February 23, 2012
 "Arizona Desert Adventures" – March 11, 2012
 "American Southwest" – March 18, 2012
 "Great Adventures" – April 29, 2012
 "On the Wild Side" – May 6, 2012
 "Giving Back" – May 13, 2012
 "Amazing Attractions" – May 20, 2012

Season Two (2012–2013)
 "Colorado Springs" – September 9, 2012
 "San Antonio" – September 16, 2012
 "Key West" – September 23, 2012
 "Denver" – September 30, 2012
 "The Amazing Los Angeles Race, Part 1" – October 7, 2012
 "The Florida Keys" – October 28, 2012
 "Madrid" – November 4, 2012
 "The Amazing Los Angeles Race, Part 2" – November 11, 2012
 "Lisbon" – November 18, 2012
 "Barcelona" – November 25, 2012
 "Elizabeth's Sweet Sixteen" – December 9, 2012
 "The Hollywood Christmas Parade" – January 27, 2013
 "High-Flying L.A. Adventures" – February 3, 2013
 "Go Wild in the Sunshine State" – February 10, 2013
 "Science, Shuttles and Outerspace" – February 17, 2013
 "The Old West" – February 24, 2013
 "Aerial and Magical Arts" – March 31, 2013
 "Discover L.A." – April 7, 2013
 "Iberian Excursions" – April 28, 2013
 "Island Adventures" – May 5, 2013
 "Taste of the World" – May 12, 2013
 "Celebrity Dance-a-thon" – June 2, 2013

Season Three (2013–2014)
 "Great Exumas Adventures, Part 1" – September 8, 2013
 "Great Exumas Adventures, Part 2" – September 15, 2013
 "Nassau" – September 22, 2013
 "Europe" – September 29, 2013
 "Harbour Island" – October 20, 2013
 "Adventure in the Bahamas" – October 27, 2013
 "Magic and Illusion" – November 3, 2013
 "Giving Back" – November 10, 2013
 "Adrenaline Adventures" – November 17, 2013
 "Hollywood Legends" – February 2, 2014
 "Medieval Adventure" – February 9, 2014
 "High Flying Adventures" – February 16, 2014
 "Lights, Camera, Action!" – February 23, 2014
 "Amazing Wildlife" – March 9, 2014
 "Life Below the Surface" – March 16, 2014
 "Epic Castles and Palaces" – March 23, 2014
 "Fab 4 Showdown" – April 13, 2014
 "Historic Cities" – April 20, 2014
 "Going the Nautical Mile" – April 27, 2014
 "Masquerade Ball, Part 1" – June 15, 2014
 "Masquerade Ball, Part 2" – June 22, 2014
 "Unusual City Tours" – June 29, 2014

Season Four (2014–2015)
 "Nevada Adventures" – September 7, 2014
 "Cowboy for a Day" – September 14, 2014
 "Palm Springs" – September 21, 2014
 "Desert Adventures" – September 28, 2014
 "Park City" – October 26, 2014
 "Olympic Games" – November 2, 2014
 "Life in a Blue Lagoon" – November 9, 2014
 "Modern Day Renaissance" – November 16, 2014
 "Eye on London" – December 7, 2014
 "Bavarian Adventures" – December 21, 2014
 "Exploring Munich" – February 1, 2015
 "German Festivals" – February 8, 2015
 "Equestrian Adventures" – February 15, 2015
 "Hip Hop Dance" – March 29, 2015

Season Five (2015–2016)
 "Prehistoric Hollywood" – September 6, 2015
 "Bahamas Adventures" – September 13, 2015
 "Life on Horseback" – September 20, 2015
 "Behind the Scenes" – September 27, 2015
 "Favorite Foods" – November 1, 2015
 "Venice" – November 8, 2015
 "Venice Carnival" – November 15, 2015
 "Slovenia" – November 22, 2015
 "Vienna" – January 10, 2016
 "Innsbruck" – January 17, 2016
 "Central Europe" – February 7, 2016
 "Southern California" – February 14, 2016
 "Room Escape Adventures" – February 21, 2016
 "Frankfurt" – May 8, 2016
 "Berlin" – May 15, 2016
 "Tropical Adventures" – May 29, 2016
 "Greece" – June 5, 2016
 "Armenia" – June 12, 2016
 "Yerevan" – June 26, 2016
 "Croatia" – July 3, 2016

Season Six (2016–2019)
 "The Culture of Armenia" – October 30, 2016
 "Dubai" – November 6, 2016
 "Moscow" – November 13, 2016
 "The Rivieras of France and Italy" – November 20, 2016
 "Montenegro" – January 29, 2017
 "St. Petersburg" – February 5, 2017
 "Winter Sports" – February 26, 2017
 "Ancient Cities" – March 19, 2017
 "High Seas Adventures" – April 9, 2017
 "Hands On Discoveries" – April 30, 2017
 "Fantastic Festivals" – November 26, 2017
 "Palaces and Palazzos" – December 3, 2017
 "Volunteering in Armenia" – December 10, 2017
 "Adriatic Adventures" – January 4, 2018
 "Jaipur" – January 28, 2018
 "Abu Dhabi" – February 25, 2018
 "Delhi" – March 25, 2018
 "Armenian Adventures" – April 15, 2018
 "Copenhagen" – May 6, 2018
 "Mumbai" – May 13, 2018
 "French Riviera" – June 10, 2018
 "Best of Agra and India" – July 1, 2018
 "Stockholm" – July 26, 2018
 "Washington D.C. & Virginia" – August 30, 2018
 "Jerusalem" – November 29, 2018
 "Best of Morocco" – January 10, 2019

Season Seven (2019–2020)
 "Tuscany" – October 14, 2019
 "Marrakesh" – November 8, 2019
 "Israel" – November 25, 2019
 "Florence" – January 27, 2020
 "Italy and the Mediterranean" – February 17, 2020
 "Amman and the Dead Sea" – February 24, 2020
 "Petra & Wadi Rum" – March 30, 2020
 "Ancient Jordan" – April 20, 2020

Season Eight (2021–2022)
 "German Adventures" – September 6, 2021
 "Exotic Journeys" – September 13, 2021
 "Flavors of Europe" – September 20, 2021
 "Middle Eastern Adventures" – September 27, 2021
 "Nordic Expedition" – December 6, 2021
 "Hidden European Games" – December 13, 2021
 "Camel Ride Adventures" – February 28, 2022
 "Amazing Animals" – March 7, 2022
 "Historical Adventures" – March 14, 2022
 "Great Capitals" – March 21, 2022
 "European Capital Cities" – March 28, 2022
 "Jewels of the Desert" – April 4, 2022
 "Classic Italy" – April 11, 2022
 "Italy on the Water" – September 5, 2022
 "Great Destinations" – September 12, 2022
 "Modern and Ancient" – September 19, 2022

External links

 
 
 

2011 American television series debuts
American educational television series
Television series by Associated Television International
First-run syndicated television programs in the United States